Arthur Swift (1892–1954) was an English professional footballer who played in the Football League as a forward for Crystal Palace and West Bromwich Albion.

Career
Swift was born in Hartlepool, England in 1892. He signed for West Bromwich Albion in 1913 and made his debut in a home 1–0 win against Preston North End on 3 January 2014. Between then and 1920, he made 28 appearances in all competitions scoring 11 times.

It is known that he served in World War I, which would have limited his appearances for the club.

In 1920, Swift signed for Crystal Palace, then playing in the Football League Third Division in its inaugural season. However, after only one league appearance, in a 0–3 away defeat to Queens Park Rangers in December 1920, Swift retired from playing in 1921 to take up coaching duties.

Personal life
Swift died in 1954, aged 61 or 62.

References

External links
Swift at holmesdale.net

1892 births
1954 deaths
Footballers from Hartlepool
English Football League players
Association football forwards
West Bromwich Albion F.C. players
Crystal Palace F.C. players
Crystal Palace F.C. non-playing staff
English footballers
British military personnel of World War I